Kitanovski is a Macedonian surname. Notable people with the surname include:

Blagoja Kitanovski (born 1962), Macedonian footballer and manager
Tome Kitanovski (born 1992), Macedonian footballer
Toni Kitanovski (born 1964), Macedonian jazz guitarist

Macedonian-language surnames